Maciej Mysiak (born 4 February 1984 in Radziszewo) is a Polish professional footballer who plays as a defender for Unia Janikowo.

Career

Club
He used to play in such a teams like Wisła Kraków, GKS Katowice (on loan), Lechia Gdańsk (on loan) and Unia Janikowo (on loan).

In the Summer 2007, he was sold to Unia Janikowo.

In June 2009, he moved to Pogoń Szczecin.

In January 2011, he joined GKS Bełchatów on two and a half year contract.

References

External links
 

1984 births
Living people
People from Gryfino County
Sportspeople from West Pomeranian Voivodeship
Polish footballers
Wisła Kraków players
GKS Katowice players
Lechia Gdańsk players
Unia Janikowo players
Pogoń Szczecin players
GKS Bełchatów players
Warta Poznań players
Flota Świnoujście players
Limanovia Limanowa players
Znicz Pruszków players
Elana Toruń players
Ekstraklasa players
I liga players
II liga players
III liga players
IV liga players
Association football defenders